Oliver Cromwell Comstock (March 1, 1780 – January 11, 1860) was a United States representative from New York.

Biography
He was born on March 1, 1780, in Warwick, Rhode Island, he moved with his parents to Schenectady, New York, when he was a child. He received a liberal schooling and studied medicine, practicing in Trumansburg. He was a member of the New York State Assembly from 1810 to 1812 and was the first judge of New York Court of Common Pleas for Seneca County, holding that office from 1812 to 1815.

Comstock was elected as a Democratic-Republican to the Thirteenth, Fourteenth, and Fifteenth Congresses, holding office from March 4, 1813, to March 3, 1819. He was not a candidate for renomination in 1818, and was the first judge of court of common pleas for Tompkins County in 1817 and 1818. He abandoned the practice of medicine and studied theology. He was licensed to preach and ordained to the Baptist ministry; he was then installed as pastor of the First Baptist Church in Rochester and served in that capacity from 1825 to 1834. He was elected Chaplain of the House of Representatives on December 20, 1836, and served until March 3, 1837. He moved to Michigan and resumed ministerial duties at Detroit in 1839; from 1841 to 1843 he was a regent of the University of Michigan at Ann Arbor, and from 1843 to 1845 he was State superintendent of public instruction. Comstock died in Marshall, Calhoun County, Michigan, in 1860; interment was in Oakridge Cemetery.

References

1780 births
1860 deaths
Politicians from Warwick, Rhode Island
Members of the New York State Assembly
New York (state) state court judges
Chaplains of the United States House of Representatives
Regents of the University of Michigan
Democratic-Republican Party members of the United States House of Representatives from New York (state)
Politicians from Schenectady, New York
People from Trumansburg, New York
19th-century American politicians
19th-century American judges